Naylhor Bispo de Souza Junior (born 24 June 1987), simply known as Naylhor, is a Brazilian footballer who plays for Paysandu as a centre-back.

Career statistics

References

External links

1987 births
Living people
Sportspeople from Minas Gerais
Brazilian footballers
Association football defenders
Campeonato Brasileiro Série B players
Campeonato Brasileiro Série C players
Campeonato Brasileiro Série D players
Nova Iguaçu Futebol Clube managers
Mesquita Futebol Clube managers
Associação Desportiva Recreativa e Cultural Icasa players
Paraná Clube players
Ituano FC players
Figueirense FC players
Botafogo Futebol Clube (SP) players
Vila Nova Futebol Clube players
Esporte Clube Água Santa players
Brasiliense Futebol Clube players
America Football Club (Rio de Janeiro) players
Clube Atlético Linense players
Tuna Luso Brasileira players
Paysandu Sport Club players